Ambonus yucatanus is a species of beetle in the family Cerambycidae. It was described by Ernst Fuchs in 1961.

References

Elaphidiini
Beetles of North America
Beetles of Central America
Insects of Mexico
Beetles described in 1961